Claud Adjapong (born 6 May 1998) is an Italian professional footballer who plays as a right-back for  club Ascoli.

Club career

Sassuolo
Adjapong is a youth exponent from Sassuolo. He made his Serie A debut on 11 March 2016 against Juventus. He replaced Matteo Politano after 89 minutes in a 1–0 away defeat.

Loan to Hellas Verona
On 21 August 2019, Adjapong joined Serie A club Verona on loan with an option to buy.

Loan to Reggina
On 9 August 2021, he moved to Serie B side Reggina on a season-long loan.

Ascoli
On 1 September 2022, Adjapong signed a three-year contract with Ascoli.

International career 
Adjapong was born and raised in Italy to parents of Ghanaian descent. Until he was 18, he only had a Ghanaian passport. He is eligible to play for the Ghana national team.

After receiving his passport, on 25 August 2016, he received a call-up from the Italy-U19. He made his debut with the Italy-U21 team on 1 September 2017, in a friendly match lost 3–0 against Spain.

Career statistics

References 

Italian footballers
U.S. Sassuolo Calcio players
Hellas Verona F.C. players
U.S. Lecce players
Reggina 1914 players
Ascoli Calcio 1898 F.C. players
Serie A players
Serie B players
Italy under-21 international footballers
Italy youth international footballers
Association football forwards
Italian people of Ghanaian descent
Italian sportspeople of African descent
Sportspeople from Modena
Living people
1998 births
Footballers from Emilia-Romagna